Larry Melvin Webster Jr. (born January 18, 1969, in Elkton, Maryland) is a retired American football defensive tackle, who spent eleven seasons in the National Football League (NFL). He played college football at University of Maryland.

Early years
A native of Elkton, Maryland, Webster graduated from Elkton High School where he was a letterman in football, basketball and track and field. His primary football position at the time was running back. He attended the University of Maryland on a full athletic scholarship. With the Terrapins football team, he made the transition to defensive lineman and was its Most Valuable Player in his senior year.

Professional career
Webster was drafted in the third round of the 1992 NFL Draft by the Miami Dolphins as a defensive tackle. Webster spent some  mediocre years in Miami before signing with the Cleveland Browns in 1995 as a backup. The Browns moved from Cleveland to Baltimore (near where Webster grew up) in 1996 to become the Baltimore Ravens. Webster had some success with the Ravens. Webster was suspended by the NFL early in the 2000 season for minor legal issues. Later that same season, he earned his only Super Bowl ring when the Ravens beat the New York Giants 34–7 in Super Bowl XXXV. Webster spent one more year with Baltimore before signing with the New York Jets in 2002.

After football
With help from Rex Ryan, Webster participated for three straight summers in the NFL Minority Coaching Fellowship Program with the Ravens in 2007 and 2008 and the Jets in 2009. He has been a football coach at Baltimore Polytechnic Institute since 2009. After three years as a volunteer assistant working primarily with the defensive linemen, he became the Engineers' head coach in 2012.

References

External links
ESPN player profile

1969 births
Living people
American football defensive linemen
Miami Dolphins players
Cleveland Browns players
Baltimore Ravens players
New York Jets players
Maryland Terrapins football players
People from Elkton, Maryland